Iñaki Gastón Crespo (born 25 May 1963, in Bilbao) is a Spanish former professional road bicycle racer.

Major results 

1983
 3rd 
 7th Overall GP Tell
1984
 1st Clásica a los Puertos de Guadarrama
 1st  Overall Vuelta a La Rioja
1st Stages 1 & 3
 1st Stage 2b Volta a la Comunitat Valenciana
 2nd Overall Vuelta a los Valles Mineros
 2nd Subida a Arrate
 3rd Overall Escalada a Montjuïc
 4th Overall Vuelta a Aragón
1st Stage 2b & 6
 6th Clásica de San Sebastián
 6th Overall Route du Sud
 10th Giro di Lombardia
 10th Overall Grand Prix du Midi Libre
1985
 1st Subida a Arrate
 1st Prueba Villafranca de Ordizia
 1st Clásica de Sabiñánigo
 2nd Overall Tour de l'Aude
1st Stage 3
 2nd Clásica de San Sebastián
 2nd Clásica a los Puertos de Guadarrama
 3rd Overall Ruota d'Oro
 3rd Klasika Primavera
 6th Overall Tirreno–Adriatico
 9th Overall Setmana Catalana de Ciclisme
1986
 1st Clásica de San Sebastián
 1st Subida a Arrate
 2nd Trofeo Luis Puig
 2nd Overall Vuelta a Burgos
 3rd Overall Vuelta a Andalucía
 5th Overall Setmana Catalana de Ciclisme
 6th Overall Paris–Nice
 6th Overall Tour of the Basque Country
1987
 1st  Overall Vuelta a Asturias 
1st Prologue, Stages 1b, 2 & 3
 1st Stage 8 Vuelta a España
 2nd Overall Volta a Galicia
1st Stage 4b
 2nd Overall Vuelta a La Rioja
 2nd Grand Prix Navarre
 3rd Overall Euskal Bizikleta
1st Stage 3
 3rd Overall Volta a Catalunya
 9th Paris–Nice
1988
 Vuelta a España
1st Stages 2 & 14 
 1st Prologue Volta a Galicia
 3rd Overall Setmana Catalana de Ciclisme
1st Stages 4 & 7
 4th Road race, National Road Championships
 7th Overall Vuelta a Aragón
1989
 1st  Overall Vuelta a Aragón
 3rd Overall Volta a Galicia
 5th Trofeo Masferrer
 6th Overall Vuelta a La Rioja
 6th Overall Euskal Bizikleta
 7th Overall Vuelta a España
1990
 1st  Overall Setmana Catalana de Ciclisme
 1st Klasika Primavera
 2nd Overall Vuelta a Aragón
1st Stage 4
 2nd Overall Vuelta a La Rioja
 3rd Overall Escalada a Montjuïc
 3rd Subida al Naranco
 4th Overall Volta a Catalunya
1st Stage 5
 4th Overall Tour of the Basque Country
 4th Trofeo Luis Puig
 5th Overall Vuelta a la Comunidad Valenciana
 5th Overall Volta a Galicia
 8th Züri-Metzgete
1991
 1st  Mountains classification Giro d'Italia
 5th Clásica de San Sebastián
 7th Overall Vuelta a Murcia
 8th Overall Setmana Catalana de Ciclisme
 9th La Flèche Wallonne
1992
 2nd Overall Setmana Catalana de Ciclisme
 3rd Klasika Primavera
1993
 1st Stage 3 Setmana Catalana de Ciclisme
 4th Clásica de San Sebastián
 7th Subida al Naranco

Grand Tour general classification results timeline

External links
 Iñaki Gastón Palmarès by urtekaria.com 

1963 births
Living people
Sportspeople from Bilbao
Cyclists from the Basque Country (autonomous community)
Spanish male cyclists